The Suchindram Theroor Vembannur Wetland Complex is a protected area comprising the Suchindram Kulam wetlands at , and the Theroor Kulam wetlands at , and the Vembannur Wetland Complex, all near Suchindram town in Kanyakumari District, Tamil Nadu, India. Being at the extreme southern tip of India, this area underlies the southernmost continental range of the Central Asian Flyway. Constitution of this new wildlife sanctuary was proposed in 2002 and remains under consideration of the Government. International name is Suchindram Therur, Vembanoor, Important bird area code no. IN279, criteria: A1, A4i. Parts of the sanctuary have been designated as protected Ramsar sites since 2022.

District of Ponds
About two thirds of the total area of Kanyakumari District is lowland plains dotted with 2,058 freshwater wetlands known as kulam or ponds. It is referred to as the District of Ponds.  In addition to Suchindram-Theroor, other major freshwater wetlands of this district include Parakkai, Manikaputheri, Thathiar, Suchindram Theroor Vembannur, Chungankadai, Putheri, Thazhaikudi and Manavalkurchi.

Kanyakumari Wildlife Sanctuary, a tiger habitat at the extreme southern end of the Western Ghats, is also in this district.

Flora

Suchindram pond has a large variety of aquatic vegetation including water lilly, lotus, floating hearts, pistia and other water plants. A few tall trees and other bushes have formed an island at the centre, which gives refuge and is a resting place for birds.

Fauna

Suchindram is noted for the wide variety of migratory waterbirds that winter there, including: near threatened painted stork and  spot-billed pelicans. Also seen here are cattle egrets, great cormorants, darters, purple swamphen, and bronze-winged jacanas. Resident raptors include pied kingfisher, brahminy kite and marsh harrier. Other water birds are dabchick, grey heron, garganey, purple heron, cinnamon bittern, open bill stork, cotton pygmy goose, whiskered tern and little tern, black-winged stilt, greenshank, little ringed plover and the common sandpiper.

Conservation
In 1993, Dr. Robert Grubh, of  Institute for Restoration of Natural Environment in Nagercoil, lead a program for Conservation and Management of Suchindram Kulam Wetland in Southern India for Promotion of Agriculture, Fishing and Ecotourism, in cooperation with the Conservation Impact Grants Program of  a consortium of the World Wildlife Fund, The Nature Conservancy, and the World Resources Institute  and funded by the United States Agency for International Development.

Some local fisherfolk and agriculturists were not happy that a project was being developed to create a bird sanctuary at the Suchindram wetlands. They were concerned that sanctuary authorities would restrain fishing activities and more birds would destroy their crops. However, a large number of local people were engaged in wetlands conservation through the projects use of local television, field demonstrations, press interviews, and community lectures to stimulate conservation awareness. The Tamil Nadu Forest Department, District Collectors, the Public Works Department, village Panchayats and others have supported the conservation efforts.

References

Wetlands of India
Ramsar sites in India
Migratory birds (Eastern Hemisphere)
Bird sanctuaries of Tamil Nadu
Proposed protected areas